Tephritis formosa is a species of tephritid fly. It is one of many species known commonly as gall fly.

Distribution
This species is found in most countries across Europe (Albania, Andorra, Austria, Balearic Islands, Belgium, United Kingdom, Ireland, Bulgaria, Czech Republic, France, Germany, Greece, Hungary, Italy, Malta, Republic of Moldova, Poland, Portugal, Romania, Slovakia, Spain, Switzerland, The Netherlands and Ukraine) and it also occurs in the Near East (Turkey, Caucasus, Israel and Iran).

Habitat
These flies inhabit  a wide range of habitats, but mainly prefer meadows, grassland and urban gardens where the  host plants grow.

Description

The adult male of Tephritis formosa is 4 to 5 mm long with wings about 4 mm long. The females are about 5 to 6 mm in length with wings of about 4 to 5 mm. The thorax and the abdomen are brownish. The head shows yellow-reddish eyes. The abdomen of the females ends in a tapered ovipositor, while it is rather rounded in males. The legs are yellowish. These small flies have light beige wings with large dark brown markings and small hyaline areas. The apical fork is missing. There are only some brown spots at end of veins R4+5 and M.

Biology
The host plants for the larva are hawksbeards (Crepis virens), cat's ear (Hypochaeris radicata)  and sow-thistle (Sonchus olearius, Sonchus aspera, Sonchus arvensis).

Larvae invade the flower heads, causing galls to form.

References

External links
 INPN
 Bugs and Weeds

Tephritinae
Insects described in 1844
Diptera of Europe